Pomatoschistus lozanoi, Lozano's goby, is a species of goby native to the northeastern Atlantic Ocean from the North Sea to northwestern Spain and Portugal where it can be found at depths of from .  This species can reach a length of  TL and is known to live for only two years. The specific name honours the Spanish zoologist Luis Lozano Rey (1878-1958).

References

Pomatoschistus
Fish of the North Sea
Fauna of Portugal
Fauna of Spain
Fauna of the British Isles
Fish described in 1923